The 2014 Women's Australian Hockey League was the 22nd edition of the women's field hockey tournament. The tournament was held in the Queensland city of Brisbane.

The New South Wales Arrows won the gold medal for the ninth time by defeating the Queensland Scorchers 3–2 in the final.

Competition format

The tournament is divided into two pools, Pool A and Pool B, consisting of four teams in a round-robin format. Teams then progress into either Pool C, the medal round, or Pool D, the classification round. Teams carry over points from their previous match ups, and contest teams they are yet to play.

The top two teams in each of pools A and B then progress to Pool C. The top two teams in Pool C continue to contest the Final, while the bottom two teams of Pool C play in the Third and Fourth-place match.

The remaining bottom placing teams make up Pool D. The top two teams in Pool D play in the Fifth and Sixth-place match, while the bottom two teams of Pool C play in the Seventh and Eighth-place match.

Teams

  Canberra Strikers
  New South Wales Arrows
  NT Pearls
  Queensland Scorchers
  SA Suns
  Tassie Van Demons
  Victorian Vipers
  WA Diamonds

Results

First round

Pool A

Pool B

Second round

Pool C (Medal Round)

Pool D (Classification Round)

Classification Games

Seventh and eighth place

Fifth and sixth place

Third and fourth place

Final

Awards

Statistics

Final standings

Goalscorers

References

External links

2014
2014 in Australian women's field hockey